Wirtschaftliche Forschungsgesellschaft mbh (WiFo) was a Nazi Germany-owned company "charged with the construction and operation of solid fuel (natural and synthetic) storage depots."

Chronology
1935 summer: At the suggestion of IG Farben, the Wirtschaftliche Forschungsgesellschaft (Wifo, Economic Research Ltd) investigated the Kohnstein mine to centralize a fuel and chemical depot.

References

German companies established in 1934
1945 disestablishments in Germany
Construction and civil engineering companies established in 1934
Energy companies disestablished in 1945
Defunct energy companies of Germany

Wirtschaftliche Forschungsgesellschaft